The 26th edition of the Men's Asian Amateur Boxing Championships were held from August 5 to August 12, 2011 in Incheon, South Korea.

Medal summary

Medal table

References
amateur-boxing

External links
Asian Boxing Confederation

2011
Asian Boxing
Boxing
Sports competitions in Incheon
International boxing competitions hosted by South Korea